Rock Run is an unincorporated community in Cherokee County, Alabama, United States.

History
Rock Run had its start as a mining community, and may have been named from a run on the rocks containing iron ore. According to another story, a settler climbing a hill dislodged a rock, and watching it roll down the hill, said "Look at that rock run!" A post office operated under the name Rock Run from 1883 to 1957.

Demographics
In 1890, it was listed on the U.S. Census as having 360 residents, making it the largest incorporated community in Cherokee County, narrowly ahead of Centre, the county seat.

Gallery
Below are photographs of Rock Run as documented by the Historic American Engineering Record:

References

External links

Historic American Engineering Record in Alabama
Unincorporated communities in Cherokee County, Alabama
Unincorporated communities in Alabama